Mechanicsville is a city in Cedar County, Iowa, United States. The population was 1,020 at the time of the 2020 census.

History
Mechanicsville was platted in 1855 by Daniel A. Comstock. It was so named from the fact several of its first settlers were mechanics. A fire in 1883 destroyed the south side of the business district.

Geography
Mechanicsville is located at  (41.905, -91.253).

Demographics

2010 census
As of the census of 2010, there were 1,146 people, 471 households, and 315 families living in the city. The racial makeup of the city was 97.8% White, 0.3% African American, 0.2% Native American, 0.3% Asian, 0.3% from other races, and 1.0% from two or more races. Hispanic or Latino of any race were 1.7% of the population.

There were 471 households, of which 28.7% had children under the age of 18 living with them, 52.4% were married couples living together, 8.9% had a female householder with no husband present, 5.5% had a male householder with no wife present, and 33.1% were non-families. 28.2% of all households were made up of individuals, and 14.3% had someone living alone who was 65 years of age or older. The average household size was 2.34 and the average family size was 2.83.

The median age in the city was 43.1 years. 22.9% of residents were under the age of 18; 6.9% were between the ages of 18 and 24; 22.7% were from 25 to 44; 29.2% were from 45 to 64; and 18.5% were 65 years of age or older. The gender makeup of the city was 47.8% male and 52.2% female.

2000 census
As of the census of 2000, there were 1,173 people, 452 households, and 312 families living in the city. The racial makeup of the city was 98.21% White, 0.09% African American, 0.51% Native American, 0.09% Asian, 0.09% from other races, and 1.02% from two or more races. Hispanic or Latino of any race were 1.36% of the population.

There were 452 households, out of which 33.8% had children under the age of 18 living with them, 54.6% were married couples living together, 9.5% had a female householder with no husband present, and 30.8% were non-families. 27.0% of all households were made up of individuals, and 14.8% had someone living alone who was 65 years of age or older. The average household size was 2.46 and the average family size was 2.97.

25.5% are under the age of 18, 7.9% from 18 to 24, 27.8% from 25 to 44, 19.0% from 45 to 64, and 19.8% who were 65 years of age or older. The median age was 38 years. For every 100 females, there were 90.1 males. For every 100 females age 18 and over, there were 84.4 males.

The median income for a household in the city was $36,053, and the median income for a family was $44,500. Males had a median income of $32,054 versus $23,125 for females. The per capita income for the city was $16,429. About 5.8% of families and 7.9% of the population were below the poverty line, including 11.4% of those under age 18 and 6.0% of those age 65 or over.

Education
The North Cedar Community School District serves the community.  It was established on July 1, 1995, by the merger of the Clarence-Lowden Community School District and the Lincoln Community School District.

References

External links
 City website

Cities in Cedar County, Iowa
Cities in Iowa
1855 establishments in Iowa
Populated places established in 1855